Stanbury is a surname. Notable people with the surname include:

Jim Stanbury (1868–1945), sculler
Jonathan Stanbury (born 1951), British fencer
Jorge Stanbury Escudero, singer-songwriter
Nathan Stanbury (1670? – 1720), Mayor of Philadelphia
Patrick Stanbury, British film producer and historian
Richard Stanbury (1923–2014), Canadian senator
Richard Stanbury (1916–2008), cricketer and diplomat
Robert Stanbury (1929–2017), Canadian public servant

See also
 Stansbury (surname)

English-language surnames